Kimmo Alkio (born 25 October 1963) is a Finnish businessman and former professional tennis player who serves as the President/CEO of Finnish IT software and service company Tietoevry.

Active on the tennis tour in the 1980s, Alkio competed as high as ATP Challenger level, winning a doubles titles in Helsinki in 1983. He featured in six Davis Cup ties for Finland from 1981 to 1987, for two singles and one doubles win.

While studying for an undergraduate business degree he played collegiate tennis at Texas A&M.

ATP Challenger titles

Doubles: (1)

See also
List of Finland Davis Cup team representatives

References

External links
 
 
 

1963 births
Living people
Finnish male tennis players
Texas A&M Aggies men's tennis players
Sportspeople from Helsinki
Businesspeople from Helsinki